Ahmed Al-Saie (born 17 December 1952) is a Bahraini sailor. He competed in the Soling event at the 1996 Summer Olympics.

References

External links
 
 

1952 births
Living people
Bahraini male sailors (sport)
Olympic sailors of Bahrain
Sailors at the 1996 Summer Olympics – Soling
Place of birth missing (living people)